Jiří Kuntoš (born 2 October 1973) is a Czech male former track and field athlete who competed in the long jump and triple jump. His international career briefly flourished in the late-1990s. He was a silver medallist behind Jonathan Edwards at the 1998 European Cup, a bronze medallist at the 1999 Summer Universiade, and a finalist at the 1999 World Championships in Athletics. He also represented his country at the European Athletics Indoor Championships and European Athletics Championships in 1998.

He is a six-time national champion, having won four straight titles in the triple jump at the Czech Athletics Championships from 1997 to 2000, as well as two indoor titles in 1997 and 1999. His highest global ranking in the triple jump was eighth in the world for the 1999 season.

International competitions

National titles
Czech Athletics Championships
Triple jump: 1997, 1998, 1999, 2000
Czech Athletics Indoor Championships
Triple jump: 1997, 1999

References

External links

Living people
1973 births
Czech male long jumpers
Czech male triple jumpers
World Athletics Championships athletes for the Czech Republic
Medalists at the 1999 Summer Universiade
Universiade bronze medalists for the Czech Republic
Universiade medalists in athletics (track and field)